Saïd El Khadraoui (born 9 April 1975) is a Belgian politician and Member of the European Parliament for Belgium with the Socialist Party – Different, part of the Socialist Group and sits on the European Parliament's Committee on Transport and Tourism.

He is a substitute for the Committee on International Trade, a member of the
Delegation to the EU-Armenia, EU-Azerbaijan and EU-Georgia Parliamentary Cooperation Committees and a
substitute for the Delegation for relations with the United States.

Personal life
El Khadraoui was born in Leuven, Belgium, to a Moroccan father and a Belgian mother.

Education
 1997: Degree in modern history (University of Leuven (KUL))
 1998: Further academic training in international relations (KUL)

Career
 1998-1999: Worked in the office of the Deputy Prime Minister and Minister of Home Affairs
 1999: Worked in the office of the Deputy Prime Minister and Minister for the Budget
 since 1999: Official at the Ministry of Foreign Affairs
 2003: Member of the national party bureau
 since 1994: Member of the Leuven City Council
 1994-2001: Deputy Mayor of Leuven
 2003: Member of the * since 2003: Member of the European Parliament

See also
 2004 European Parliament election in Belgium

References

External links

 
 
 

1975 births
Living people
Belgian people of Moroccan descent
Belgian Muslims
KU Leuven alumni
Socialistische Partij Anders MEPs
MEPs for Belgium 1999–2004
MEPs for Belgium 2004–2009
MEPs for Belgium 2009–2014